Maa Junior Tanuvasa (born November 6, 1970) is a former American football defensive end, mainly for the Denver Broncos.  He played nine years in the National Football League (NFL), winning two Super Bowl championships as a main component of the Broncos defense.

High school and college years
Tanuvasa was an Interscholatic All-Star in football and track and field at Mililani High School in Mililani, Hawai'i.  He moved on to the University of Hawaii, where he starred for three years, amassing 190 tackles and 10 sacks and helping Hawaii to the 1992 Western Athletic Conference championship.

Professional career
He was drafted in the eighth round by the Los Angeles Rams in the 1993 NFL Draft and spent his rookie year with them. In 1994, he was cut by the Rams and spent a part of the season on the Pittsburgh Steelers' practice squad.

His first NFL season was with the Broncos in 1995, when he played one game.  He worked his way into the rotation by the 1996 season, and by 1998, was a regular starter.  He led the Broncos in sacks in the 1998 and 1999 seasons. He was on the Bronco teams which won the 1997 and 1998 Super Bowl championships.

After the 2000 season with the Broncos, he joined the San Diego Chargers for one year, and the Atlanta Falcons for the next.  He has not been in the NFL since, having returned to his native Hawai'i, where he served as an assistant football coach at his alma mater, Mililani High School.

He was inducted into the Hawai'i Sports Hall of Fame in 2006.

References

External links
Hawai'i Sports Hall of Fame
NFL player page

1970 births
Living people
American sportspeople of Samoan descent
People from Oahu
American football defensive ends
Hawaii Rainbow Warriors football players
Los Angeles Rams players
Pittsburgh Steelers players
Denver Broncos players
San Diego Chargers players
Atlanta Falcons players
Players of American football from American Samoa
People from Nu'uuli